The Queensland Women's Electoral League (QWEL) was an organisation founded in 1903 in Brisbane to advance the cause of women's suffrage in Queensland, Australia.

History
Its founder and first president was Christina Jane Corrie (then the Lady Mayoress of Brisbane, her husband Leslie Corrie being mayor). Margaret Ogg was a prominent and long-time member of the organisation.

In 1908, the League created the Brisbane Women's Club, one of Brisbane's first clubs for women.

References

Women's suffrage in Australia
1903 establishments in Australia
Organizations established in 1903
Organisations based in Queensland